Baphia latiloi is a species of plant in the family Fabaceae. It is found in Cameroon and Nigeria. It is threatened by habitat loss.

References

latiloi
Flora of Cameroon
Flora of Nigeria
Vulnerable plants
Taxonomy articles created by Polbot